Pickens High School may refer to:

 Pickens High School (Georgia)
 Pickens High School (South Carolina)